Korean Cubans (Hangukgye kubain) are citizens of Cuba of Korean ancestry. Most of them are descendants of Korean immigrant farmers from Mexico who left to Cuba in search of a better life. Today about 800 descendants of the Korean farmers live around Havana, Matanzas and other areas of Cuba.

History of migration
The first ethnic Koreans to arrive in Cuba came from Mexico's Yucatán Peninsula in search of a better life. In 1905, 1,033 Koreans set sail on a cargo ship from Incheon to Yucatán. Upon arrival, instead of the riches they had promised, all they found was the most menial type of labor. They were sold to 22 landlords and became sugarcane and hemp (henequen) cutters, toiling from sun-up till sundown in the dry and harsh tropical sun. Most of them settled there as field hands. On 25 May 1921, three hundred of them immigrated to Cuba from Mexico, hoping for better living conditions, but found them just as lamentable

The Koreans' arrival coincided with a generally favorable economy in Cuba mostly due to sugar but soon sugar prices dropped drastically and there was no work. Land that had formerly grown sugar was now converted to growing henequen and employed the Korean farmers as cutters. The Koreans, bringing their henequen-cutting skills from Mexico soon showed their good skills and productivity which allowed some to rise to specialized fieldwork and even become trainers and supervisors.

Cubaiminsa
Korean immigrant Lim Cheontaek wrote a history book called Cubaiminsa in 1954 that describes the history of Korean immigrants living in Cuba.

Language
Most Korean Cubans today speak the Spanish language. A Cuba-Korea culture center was built in 1921 that taught Korean writing and history in an attempt to remind the descendants of their heritage. But lack of funding shuttered the center and now it is hard to find a descendant of the Korean immigrants who can speak the Korean language.

Famous Korean Cubans
Jeronimo Lim Kim

See also

 Asian Latin Americans
 Asian Hispanic and Latino Americans
 Chinese Cubans
 Japanese Cubans

References

External links
 "Five Generations On, Mexico's Koreans Long for Home." The Chosun Ilbo. 16 August 2008.

Asian Cuban
Ethnic groups in Cuba
Korean diaspora in North America
Korean Latin American
Cuba